Kalamansig, officially the Municipality of Kalamansig (Jawi: ايڠايد نو كلامانسيڬ),  is a 1st class municipality in the province of Sultan Kudarat, Philippines. According to the 2020 census, it has a population of 50,900 people.

The main means of livelihood of the people is farming and fishing. The municipality's marine environment is home to various species of marine wildlife and plants, the most important of which is the giant tamilok, the largest shipworm species in the world. The species can only be found within the area, and no where else in the world, making Kalamansig an important biodiversity area. Formerly hunted by the locals, the giant tamiloks are now strictly protected by the municipality, specifically the former hunters of the species, after research confirmed the high importance of the species in the area's biodiversity.

The nearest point of entry is through Cotabato Airport, Cotabato City. The town can easily be reached by taking the fully cemented Upi-Lebak National Road. Convenient and safe public transport that plies directly to Kalamansig are also available at NCCC Mall Davao, General Santos Public Terminal, Cotabato City Lebak-Kalamansig Terminal and Tacurong City Public Terminal.

Etymology
Like most municipalities in the Philippines, Kalamansig traces its name from various legendary origins. A popular folklore among the Manobos, a tribe of people who were among the earliest inhabitants of the place, explained that the name originated from a phrase “Kulaman-su-wayeg”, which literally translates as “Kulaman in the water”. Kulaman is said to be a famous Sultan of the Valley during the seventeenth century. According to the legend, a long famine came to the place and the Sultan, who was a loving father and provider to his family, ventured alone and gathered cassava, a staple food of the Manobos, for their consumption. Before returning home, the Sultan decided to wash the root crop in a river, but a sudden and strong river current arrived and swept the aging Sultan from his feet, carrying him downstream and was drowned in the process. His body was later found and recovered downriver, coining the word “Kulaman-sa-ig” (Kulaman in the water).

The name evolved into “Kalamansig” which later become the official name. In honor of this Manobo tribal leader, the river where he was found was named after him and later, the entire upper valley was called “Kulaman”. This barangay is now part of the Municipality of Sen. Ninoy Aquino.

History

The existing seat of government of Kalamansig was formerly the municipality of Lebak. The first attempt to separate was on Lebak (presently Kalamansig) was under the municipal district of Kiamba while Salaman (now Lebak) use under the district of Dinaig on August 18, 1947, under Executive Order No. 82. and it was again reunited under one independent municipality of Lebak on December 31, 1948. The seat of government was transferred to Salaman on April 12, 1951.

Ten years later, the Municipality of Kalamansig formally created by the virtue of Executive Order No. 459 dated December 29, 1961 signed by Carlos P. Garcia, creating the municipality of Kalamansig from certain barangays of Lebak and Palimbang.

There are 20 barangays and sitios carved out from Lebak: Lun, Pitas, Dansalan, Pedtegenan, Madu, Port Lebak, Lenek, Santa Clara, Sebayor, Nalilidan, Bosawon, Calubcub, Camp III, Poral, Limulan, Simsiman, Cadiz and Tipudos. The 8 barangays and sitios were taken from Palimbang are Sangay, Mat, Danawan, Paril, Babancao, Basiawan, Narra and North Kulaman.

Kalamansig was transferred from Cotabato Province to Province of Sultan Kudarat on November 22, 1973, by Presidential Decree No. 341 by President Ferdinand Marcos.
Kalamansig lies the few miles from the epicenter of the devastating 1976 Moro Gulf earthquake.

In 2004, gigantic shipworms were discovered by the locals within the municipal waters. In 2017, the shipworms were formally researched on by local and international scientists. The research confirmed that the giant Kalamansig tamilok is kuphus polythalamia and is the largest species of its kind in the world. Due to the research, Kamalansig became the first and only known permanent natural habitat of the endangered species.

Geography
Kalamansig is a coastal municipality located to west of Sultan kudarat.

Barangays
It is politically subdivided into 15 Barangays:
 Bantogon 
 Cadiz
 Datu Ito Andong
 Datu Wasay
 Dumangas Nuevo
 Hinalaan
 Limulan
 Nalilidan
 Obial
 Pag-asa (Sultan Gunting Mopak)
 Paril
 Poblacion
 Sabanal
 Sangay
 Santa Clara
 Santa Maria

Climate

Demographics

Economy

Education

Elementary
 Datu Guiabar Pilot School/DGPS (Barangay Poblacion), Kalamansig District I
 Ricardo Cabaluna Memorial Elementary School/ RCMES (Barangay Sangay), Kalamansig District II
 R.D. Talapian Sr. Memorial Elementary School/ RDTSMES (Barangay Paril), Kalamansig District II
 Teresita Patalinjug Elementary School/TPES (Barangay Cadiz), Kalamansig District I
 Artemio L. Martin Elementary School/ALMES (Barangay Obial), Kalamansig District I
 Santa Clara Central Elementary School/ SCES (Barangay Santa Clara), Kalamansig District II
 Nalilidan Elementary School/NES (Barangay Nalilidan), Kalamansig District II
 Don Modesto S. Buenaflor Sr. Elementary School (Barangay Dumangas Nuevo), Kalamansig District I
 Santa Maria Elementary School (Barangay Sta Maria), Kalamansig District I
 Pag-asa Elementary School/PES (Barangay Pag-Asa), Kalamansig District II
 Datu Etang Integrated School School/DEPS (Sitio Meles, Barangay Hinalaan), Kalamansig District II
 Datu Wasay Elementary School/DWES (Sitio Proper, Barangay Datu Wasay), Kalamansig District II
 Saint Andrew's Mission School-/SAMS (Sitio Tinandoc, Barangay Datu Wasay), Kalamansig District II
 Costa Rica Elementary School (Costa Rica, Barangay Datu Wasay), Kalamansig District II
 Limulan Elementary School LES (Barangay Limulan), Kalamansig District II
 F.B. Concha Primary School/FBCPS (Barangay Limulan), Kalamansig District II
 Datu Ito Andong Memorial Elementary School/DIAMES (Barangay Datu Ito Andong), Kalamansig District II
 Ma-at Primary School /MPS (Sitio Ma-at, Barangay Sangay), Kalamansig District II

High school
 Kalamansig National High School-Main (Barangay Poblacion)
 Kalamansig National High School-Datu Wasay HS (Barangay Datu Wasay)
 Kalamansig National High School-Sabanal HS (Barangay Sabanal)
 Santa Clara National High School-(Barangay Santa Clara)
 Sangay National High School (Barangay Sangay)
 Notre Dame of Kalamansig City (Barangay Poblacion)

Integrated School
Datu Etang Integrated School

University/College
 Sultan Kudarat State University - Kalamansig Campus

References

External links
 Kalamansig Profile at PhilAtlas.com
 Kalamansig Profile at the DTI Cities and Municipalities Competitive Index
 [ Philippine Standard Geographic Code]
 Philippine Census Information
 Local Governance Performance Management System

Municipalities of Sultan Kudarat
Establishments by Philippine executive order